Zabrus laticollis is a species ground beetle in the Pelor subgenus that is can be found on Dodecanese islands and the Near East.

References

Beetles described in 1904
Beetles of Asia
Zabrus